Changzhou Island, formerly known in English as Dane or , is an island in the Pearl River Delta of China's Guangdong Province. It is now administered as part of Guangzhou's Huangpu District, although the historic Huangpu Island was nearby Pazhou, which forms part of Haizhu District.

Geography

History
During the Canton trade, Changzhou was used by Danish crews for repairs and burials. It lay on the eastern side of the Huangpu or "Whampoa" anchorage.

The island was the site of Sun Yat-sen's Whampoa Military Academy  (. 1924) and the 1926 Zhongshan Incident that propelled the academy's commandant Chiang Kai-shek to leadership over the Chinese Nationalists and then all of Warlord China.

Transportation
Changzhou is now linked to Guangzhou's road network by a bridge to neighboring Xiaoguwei and will be served by the Phase II eastern extension of Guangzhou Metro Line 7.

References

Huangpu District, Guangzhou
Islands of Guangzhou
Pearl River Delta